Tamsica floricolans is a moth of the family Crambidae. It is endemic to the Hawaiian islands of Oahu, Molokai and Lanai.

Adults have been reared from whitish larvae among the roots of sugarcane. The larvae spin a frail cocoon in the soil.

External links

Diptychophorini
Endemic moths of Hawaii